Hōsui-Susukino Station (豊水すすきの駅) is a Sapporo Municipal Subway in Chūō-ku, Sapporo, Hokkaido, Japan. The station number is H09.

The station is situated relatively close to Susukino on the Namboku Line and the Sapporo Streetcar, but there are no free transfers between the two stations.

The first retail store, a Lawson, was opened in the station on January 31, 2019, after the station's Lawson kiosk was closed in July 2015.

Platforms

Surrounding area
 Japan National Route 36, (to Muroran)
 Shinzenkoji (Jodo), Temple
 Chuokoji (Soto), Temple
 Tabata Hospital
 Susukino Central Police Station
 Minami San-jo Post Office
 Tanukikoji Shopping arcade
 Jasmac Plaza (Onsen Hotel)
 Susukino Green Hotel 1 & 3
 White Inn 6・2, Hotel
 APA Sapporo Suskino Hotel
 AOKI Bowling center
 Geo Dinos (Head office), amusement center
 VIVA Home store, Toyohira branch
 Sapporo Food Center store, Toyohira branch
 Aiba Central Sapporo satellite, (gambling center)
 North Pacific Bank, Susukino Chuo branch
 Hokkaido Bank, Susukino branch
 Tomakomai shinkin Bank, Sapporo branch

References

External links

 Sapporo Subway Stations

 

Railway stations in Japan opened in 1988
Railway stations in Sapporo
Sapporo Municipal Subway
Chūō-ku, Sapporo